Kenneth Clarke (4 June 1931 – 31 August 2014) was an Australian field hockey player. He competed in the men's tournament at the 1956 Summer Olympics.

References

External links
 

1931 births
2014 deaths
Australian male field hockey players
Olympic field hockey players of Australia
Field hockey players at the 1956 Summer Olympics
Place of birth missing